At the conclusion of the NCAA men's and women's Division I basketball championships (the "Final Four" tournaments), a media panel selects a Most Outstanding Player (MOP). It is usually awarded to a member of the championship team. There have been 12 instances in which the winner was not from the championship team. The last man to win the award despite not being on the championship team was Hakeem Olajuwon (Houston) in 1983. Dawn Staley (Virginia) was the only woman to do so, when she won the award in 1991. In 1944, Arnie Ferrin of Utah was the first freshman to win the award.

Past winners 
An asterisk (*) next to a player's name indicates they did not play for the championship team.

NCAA men's Division I MOP award 

1939 – Jimmy Hull, Ohio State*
1940 – Marvin Huffman, Indiana
1941 – John Kotz, Wisconsin
1942 – Howie Dallmar, Stanford
1943 – Ken Sailors, Wyoming
1944 – Arnie Ferrin, Utah
1945 – Bob Kurland, Oklahoma A&M
1946 – Bob Kurland, Oklahoma A&M
1947 – George Kaftan, Holy Cross
1948 – Alex Groza, Kentucky
1949 – Alex Groza, Kentucky
1950 – Irwin Dambrot, CCNY
1951 – Bill Spivey, Kentucky
1952 – Clyde Lovellette, Kansas
1953 – B. H. Born, Kansas*
1954 – Tom Gola, La Salle
1955 – Bill Russell, San Francisco
1956 – Hal Lear, Temple*
1957 – Wilt Chamberlain, Kansas*
1958 – Elgin Baylor, Seattle*
1959 – Jerry West, West Virginia*
1960 – Jerry Lucas, Ohio State
1961 – Jerry Lucas, Ohio State*
1962 – Paul Hogue, Cincinnati
1963 – Art Heyman, Duke*
1964 – Walt Hazzard, UCLA
1965 – Bill Bradley, Princeton*
1966 – Jerry Chambers, Utah*
1967 – Lew Alcindor, UCLA
1968 – Lew Alcindor, UCLA
1969 – Lew Alcindor, UCLA
1970 – Sidney Wicks, UCLA
1971 – Vacated
1972 – Bill Walton, UCLA
1973 – Bill Walton, UCLA
1974 – David Thompson, NC State
1975 – Richard Washington, UCLA
1976 – Kent Benson, Indiana
1977 – Butch Lee, Marquette
1978 – Jack Givens, Kentucky
1979 – Earvin Johnson, Michigan State
1980 – Darrell Griffith, Louisville
1981 – Isiah Thomas, Indiana
1982 – James Worthy, North Carolina 
1983 – Akeem Olajuwon, Houston*
1984 – Patrick Ewing, Georgetown
1985 – Ed Pinckney, Villanova
1986 – Pervis Ellison, Louisville
1987 – Keith Smart, Indiana
1988 – Danny Manning, Kansas
1989 – Glen Rice, Michigan
1990 – Anderson Hunt, UNLV
1991 – Christian Laettner, Duke
1992 – Bobby Hurley, Duke
1993 – Donald Williams, North Carolina
1994 – Corliss Williamson, Arkansas
1995 – Ed O'Bannon, UCLA
1996 – Tony Delk, Kentucky
1997 – Miles Simon, Arizona
1998 – Jeff Sheppard, Kentucky
1999 – Richard Hamilton, Connecticut
2000 – Mateen Cleaves, Michigan State
2001 – Shane Battier, Duke
2002 – Juan Dixon, Maryland
2003 – Carmelo Anthony, Syracuse
2004 – Emeka Okafor, Connecticut
2005 – Sean May, North Carolina
2006 – Joakim Noah, Florida
2007 – Corey Brewer, Florida
2008 – Mario Chalmers, Kansas
2009 – Wayne Ellington, North Carolina
2010 – Kyle Singler, Duke
2011 – Kemba Walker, Connecticut
2012 – Anthony Davis, Kentucky
2013 – Luke Hancock, Louisville
2014 – Shabazz Napier, Connecticut
2015 – Tyus Jones, Duke
2016 – Ryan Arcidiacono, Villanova
2017 – Joel Berry II, North Carolina
2018 – Donte DiVincenzo, Villanova
2019 – Kyle Guy, Virginia
2020 – None
2021 – Jared Butler, Baylor
2022 – Ochai Agbaji, Kansas

NCAA women's Division I MOP award 

1982 – Janice Lawrence, Louisiana Tech
1983 – Cheryl Miller, Southern California
1984 – Cheryl Miller, Southern California
1985 – Tracy Claxton, Old Dominion
1986 – Clarissa Davis, Texas
1987 – Tonya Edwards, Tennessee
1988 – Erica Westbrooks, Louisiana Tech
1989 – Bridgette Gordon, Tennessee
1990 – Jennifer Azzi, Stanford
1991 – Dawn Staley, Virginia*
1992 – Molly Goodenbour, Stanford
1993 – Sheryl Swoopes, Texas Tech
1994 – Charlotte Smith, North Carolina
1995 – Rebecca Lobo, Connecticut
1996 – Michelle M. Marciniak, Tennessee
1997 – Chamique Holdsclaw, Tennessee
1998 – Chamique Holdsclaw, Tennessee
1999 – Ukari Figgs, Purdue
2000 – Shea Ralph, Connecticut
2001 – Ruth Riley, Notre Dame
2002 – Swin Cash, Connecticut
2003 – Diana Taurasi, Connecticut
2004 – Diana Taurasi, Connecticut
2005 – Sophia Young, Baylor
2006 – Laura Harper, Maryland
2007 – Candace Parker, Tennessee
2008 – Candace Parker, Tennessee
2009 – Tina Charles, Connecticut
2010 – Maya Moore, Connecticut
2011 – Danielle Adams, Texas A&M
2012 – Brittney Griner, Baylor
2013 – Breanna Stewart, Connecticut
2014 – Breanna Stewart, Connecticut
2015 – Breanna Stewart, Connecticut
2016 – Breanna Stewart, Connecticut
2017 – A'ja Wilson, South Carolina
2018 – Arike Ogunbowale, Notre Dame
2019 – Chloe Jackson, Baylor
2020 – None
2021 – Haley Jones, Stanford
2022 – Aliyah Boston, South Carolina

Notes

References

External links 
 Final Four - Most Outstanding Player from Basketball.com
 NCAA basketball tournament Most Outstanding Players History from InsideHoops.com
 NCAA Tournament Most Outstanding Players: Where Are They Now? from LostLettermen.com

College basketball trophies and awards in the United States
Most Outstanding Player
Most Outstanding Player
Awards established in 1939
Basketball most valuable player awards
1939 establishments in the United States
Associated Press awards